The Reynolds Bridge in Thomaston, Connecticut is an open-spandrel concrete arch bridge carrying Waterbury Road (unsigned State Road 848) over the Naugatuck River.  Built in 1928, it is one of a small number of surviving open-spandrel bridges in the state.  It was listed on the National Register of Historic Places in 2004.

Description and history
The Reynolds Bridge is located roughly midway between Waterbury and the town center of Thomaston, just east of Connecticut Route 8's Exit 38. It is oriented northwest-southeast, and spans the Naugatuck River, the active railroad of the Naugatuck Railroad, which run along the river's east bank, and a former right-of-way of a streetcar line which ran along the river's west bank. The bridge is a three-arch open spandrel concrete structure, with four concrete beam approach spans on either side. The arches are joined by crossing struts, and vertical columns rise from the arch to support the road deck.

At the time of its construction in 1928, the state used open-spandrel design was used for the longest concrete bridge crossings, and this was the longest designed by the Connecticut State Highway Department up to that time. The Cornwall Bridge, built a few years later over the Housatonic River, has a longer span. At the time of its National Register listing in 2004, it was one of six open-spandrel bridges in the state.

See also
National Register of Historic Places listings in Litchfield County, Connecticut
List of bridges on the National Register of Historic Places in Connecticut

References

Road bridges on the National Register of Historic Places in Connecticut
Bridges completed in 1928
Thomaston, Connecticut
Bridges in Litchfield County, Connecticut
National Register of Historic Places in Litchfield County, Connecticut
Concrete bridges in the United States
Open-spandrel deck arch bridges in the United States